Knottsville may refer to:

Knottsville, Kentucky, an unincorporated community in eastern Daviess County
Knottsville, West Virginia, an unincorporated community in Taylor County